The following properties in Southbridge, Massachusetts are listed on the National Register of Historic Places.

Southbridge

|}

References

Buildings and structures in Southbridge, Massachusetts
Southbridge
Southbridge, Massachusetts